The 2010 Whites Drug Store Classic was held from November 11 to November 14 at Swan Lake Curling Club in Swan Lake, Manitoba. In the final, defending champion Kevin Martin of Alberta defeated Darrell McKee of Saskatchewan 6–2 in 7 ends.

Teams

Results

A Event

B Event

C Event

Playoffs
All times shown in Central Standard Time

Quarterfinals
Sunday, November 14, 9:00am

Semifinals
Sunday, November 14, 12:00pm

Final
Sunday, November 14, 3:00pm

External links

2010 in Canadian curling
2010 in Manitoba
Curling in Manitoba